Jean-Louis Leonetti (14 July 1938 – 2 August 2020) was a French football player and manager.

Early and personal life
Born in Marseille, his brother Henri was also a footballer.

Career
Leonetti played as a defender and midfielder for Marseille, Nice, Le Havre, Rouen, Bordeaux, Aix, Angoulême, Paris Saint-Germain and Paris FC.

After retiring as a player he managed Paris Saint-Germain B and SMUC.

References

1938 births
2020 deaths
French footballers
French football managers
Olympique de Marseille players
OGC Nice players
Le Havre AC players
FC Rouen players
FC Girondins de Bordeaux players
Pays d'Aix FC players
Angoulême Charente FC players
Paris Saint-Germain F.C. players
Paris FC players
Ligue 1 players
Ligue 2 players
Association football defenders
Association football midfielders
Paris Saint-Germain F.C. non-playing staff